Barsakelmes Lake is a portion of water located between the Northern and Western Seas of the former unified Aral Sea. It is the last remainder of the Eastern basin of the former South Aral Sea.

See also
 Barsa-Kelmes

Aral Sea